Just over the railroad tracks in Old Fort, North Carolina, is the town square defined by a  arrowhead hand-chiseled in granite. The landmark was unveiled to a crowd of more than 6,000 people on July 27, 1930, by Marie Nesbitt  as a symbol of the peace achieved in an earlier century between pioneers and Native Americans.

The train always stopped here. For many years, travelers through these mountains looked for the familiar sight of a tall, hand-carved arrowhead in front of the depot, signaling a stop in the historic town of Old Fort. As one of the oldest towns in the region, it prides itself on its historic roots. Originally a fort built by the colonial militia before the Declaration of Independence, the settlement served for many years as the westernmost outpost of the early United States. In those days, it was also the site of many skirmishes between pioneer settlers and Native Americans. Much of the fighting, in fact, took place on the banks of Mill Creek, which runs through the center of town.

1930 sculptures
Buildings and structures in McDowell County, North Carolina
Monuments and memorials in North Carolina
Tourist attractions in McDowell County, North Carolina
Granite sculptures in North Carolina
1930 establishments in North Carolina